Hyalinizing trabecular adenoma (or Hyalinizing trabecular adenoma) is a subtype of thyroid adenoma.

References

Thyroid tumor